The Plane Makers is a British television series created by Wilfred Greatorex and produced by Rex Firkin. ATV made three series for ITV between 1963 and 1965. It was succeeded by The Power Game, which ran for an additional three series from 1965 to 1969. Firkin continued as producer for the first two series, and David Reid took over for series 3.

The Plane Makers
The Plane Makers focused on the power struggles between the trades union and the management on the shop floor of a fictional aircraft factory, Scott Furlong Ltd, as well as the political in-fighting amongst the management themselves. Patrick Wymark proved particularly popular as the anti-heroic Managing Director John Wilder, who was "a bully and a boor", who "is forgiven only if he gets results". Wilder's nemesis in the boardroom in the third series was David Corbett (Alan Dobie), though he was supported by his long-suffering wife Pamela (Ann Firbank, standing in for Barbara Murray from series 2), his Sales Director and confidant Don Henderson (Jack Watling) and ever-reliable secretary Miss Lingard (Norma Ronald). In the first two series their task was to manufacture and sell their aircraft, the Sovereign, to an international market. In series 3, Wilder unexpectedly changed strategy to a military VTOL jet aircraft, by taking over the firm of Ryan Airframe.

The Power Game
According to one report, it was on Gretorex's advice that the drama "left the factory floor for the executive suite". At the end of the final Plane Makers series in January 1965, Wilder left Scott Furlong after a project for the Scott-Furlong Predator, a vertical takeoff aircraft, had failed, and took a seat on the board of a merchant bank while also collecting a knighthood. He returned eleven months later in The Power Game. Bored with being a gentleman of leisure, Wilder uses his influence with the bank on whose board he sits to become Joint Managing Director of an established building firm, Bligh Construction. The first two series of The Power Game in 1965–66 chronicled his attempts to keep control in the face of opposition from the company's elderly founder Caswell Bligh (Clifford Evans), a stern, old-school patriarch who resents what he sees as Wilder's imposition on a family firm, and Bligh's ambitious but inexperienced son Kenneth (Peter Barkworth), who would prefer to be sole managing director, and free of his father's influence. Both Henderson and Miss Lingard were back in harness.

Wilder's private life came more to the fore in The Power Game; he has a long-running affair with a civil servant, Susan Weldon (Rosemary Leach), but is aghast when his wife Pamela also plays the field, with engineering expert Frank Hagadan (George Sewell).

The third and final series in 1969 saw Wilder free from Bligh's—but not from Bligh himself—and working for the British government as a 'roving' Foreign Office Ambassador for Trade.

Patrick Wymark died suddenly in 1970 and it was decided not to continue with the series without its most notorious and memorable character.

Archives Status
Only Episode 1 of Series 1 of Plane Makers exists, but series 2 and 3 survive, all as 16mm-film telerecordings. All three series of The Power Game survive as 16mm-film telerecordings.

Regular cast – The Plane Makers

John Wilder                   –       Patrick Wymark
Don Henderson                 –       Jack Watling
David Corbett                 –       Alan Dobie
Dusty Miller                  –       John Junkin
Arthur Sugden                 –       Reginald Marsh
Henry Forbes                  –       Robert Urquhart
James Cameron Grant           –       Peter Jeffrey
Kay Lingard                   –       Norma Ronald
Pamela Wilder                 –       Barbara Murray, (Ann Firbank some episodes, series 3)
Laura Challis                 –       Wendy Gifford
Sir Gordon Revidge            –       Norman Tyrrell

Regular cast – The Power Game

Sir John Wilder               –       Patrick Wymark
Don Henderson                 –       Jack Watling
Caswell Bligh                 –       Clifford Evans
Kenneth Bligh                 –       Peter Barkworth
Susan Weldon                  –       Rosemary Leach (Series 1-2)
Justine Bligh                 –       Rachel Herbert (Series 1-2)
Miss Lingard                  –       Norma Ronald (Series 1-2)
Lady Wilder                   –       Barbara Murray
Frank Hagadan                 –       George Sewell (Series 1-2) 
Charles Grainger              –       Robin Bailey (second Series)
Sir Gordon Revidge            –       Norman Tyrrell
Sir Jason Fowler              –       Richard Hurndall (third series)
Lincoln Dowling               –       Michael Jayston (third series)
Garfield Kane                 –       Barrie Ingham (third series)
Jill (Wilder's secretary)     –       Deborah Grant (third series)

DVD releases
Network has released the following DVD boxsets.

References
 

Footnotes

External links

British Film Institute Screen Online

Aviation television series
ITV television dramas
1960s British drama television series
Television shows produced by Associated Television (ATV)
English-language television shows
Black-and-white British television shows
Television shows shot at ATV Elstree Studios